The Takeyoriwake Sho (in Japanese: 建依別賞), is a race for three-year-old and up fillies in the Kochi Horse Racing Association.

Race Details

The race was established in 1977 and the first edition of the race was held in 1978. It was known as the "Kenyoku Betsu Special ", but changed its name in 1989.

The original race 1,600 meters long but was then shortened to 1,400 meters in 1985.

Winners since 2014

Past winners

Past winners include:

See also
 Horse racing in Japan
 List of Japanese flat horse races

References

Horse races in Japan